Andrusenko is a Ukrainian surname. Notable people with the surname include:

 Kornei Andrusenko (1899–1976), Soviet-Ukrainian colonel
 Veronika Andrusenko (born 1991), Russian swimmer
 Viacheslav Andrusenko (born 1992), Russian swimmer

See also
 

Ukrainian-language surnames